Denmark participated in the Eurovision Song Contest 2008 with the song "All Night Long" written by Jacob Launbjerg, Svend Gudiksen and Nis Bøgvad. The song was performed by Simon Mathew. The Danish broadcaster DR organised the national final Dansk Melodi Grand Prix 2008 in order to select the Danish entry for the 2008 contest in Belgrade, Serbia. The national selection consisted of two televised semi-finals, a radio wildcard selection and a televised final. In the final, the winner was selected by regional televoting. "All Night Long" performed by Simon Mathew was the winner after gaining the most votes.

Denmark was drawn to compete in the second semi-final of the Eurovision Song Contest which took place on 22 May 2008. Performing during the show in position 13, "All Night Long" was announced among the 10 qualifying entries of the second semi-final and therefore qualified to compete in the final on 24 May. It was later revealed that Denmark placed third out of the 19 participating countries in the semi-final with 112 points. In the final, Denmark performed in position 16 and placed fifteenth out of the 25 participating countries, scoring 60 points.

Background 

Prior to the 2008 contest, Denmark had participated in the Eurovision Song Contest thirty-six times since its first entry in 1957. In the 2007 contest, "Drama Queen" performed by DQ failed to qualify Denmark to the final.

The Danish national broadcaster, DR, broadcasts the event within Denmark and organises the selection process for the nation's entry. DR confirmed their intentions to participate at the 2008 Eurovision Song Contest on 4 February 2007. Denmark has selected all of their Eurovision entries through the national final Dansk Melodi Grand Prix. Along with their participation confirmation, the broadcaster announced that Dansk Melodi Grand Prix 2008 would be organised in order to select Denmark's entry for the 2008 contest.

Before Eurovision

Dansk Melodi Grand Prix 2008
Dansk Melodi Grand Prix 2008 was the 38th edition of Dansk Melodi Grand Prix, the music competition that selects Denmark's entries for the Eurovision Song Contest. The event included two semi-finals held on 12 and 19 January 2008, a radio wildcard selection between 21 and 25 February 2008 followed by a final held on 2 February 2008. All shows in the competition were hosted by Camilla Ottesen and Adam Duvå Hall and televised on DR1 as well as streamed online at the official DR website.

Format 
Sixteen songs competed in the competition which consisted of two semi-finals and a final. Eight songs competed in each semi-final and the top four as determined exclusively by a public vote qualified to the final. The remaining non-qualifying songs proceeded to a wildcard selection where they were split into two groups. A public vote by listeners of DR P3 and DR P4 each selected two wildcards for the final from four songs competing in their groups. The winner in the final was determined again exclusively by a public vote. Viewers were able to vote via SMS.

Competing entries 
DR opened a submission period between 24 August 2007 and 10 October 2007 for composers to submit their entries. All composers and lyricists were required to be Danish citizens or have a strong connection to Denmark. The broadcaster received 443 entries during the submission period. A selection committee selected sixteen songs from the entries submitted to the broadcaster, while the artists of the selected entries were chosen by DR in consultation with their composers. DR held a press meet and greet at the DR Byen in Copenhagen on 7 December 2007 where the competing artists and songs were announced and officially presented.

Shows

Semi-finals
The two semi-finals took place on 12 and 19 January 2008 at the DR Studio 5 in Copenhagen. The top four of each semi-final advanced to the final based on a public vote. In addition to the performances of the competing entries, Aura and The Loft performed as the interval acts during the first semi-final, while Hej Matematik and Juanes performed as the interval acts during the second semi-final.

Wildcard selection 
Listeners of DR P3 and DR P4 were able to vote for the songs competing in their respective groups between 21 and 25 January 2008. The song with the most votes in each group that advanced to the final were announced on 25 January 2008.

Final 
The final took place on 2 February 2008 at the Forum Horsens in Horsens. The running order was determined by DR and announced on 24 January 2008. The winner, "All Night Long" performed by Simon Mathew, was selected solely by a public vote. The voting results of each of Denmark's five regions were converted to points which were distributed as follows: 4, 6, 8, 10 and 12 points. In addition to the performances of the competing entries, Anna David as well as Jamie Scott and the Town performed as the interval acts.

Ratings

At Eurovision
It was announced in September 2007 that the competition's format would be expanded to two semi-finals in 2008. According to Eurovision rules, all nations with the exceptions of the host country and the "Big Four" (France, Germany, Spain and the United Kingdom) are required to qualify from one of two semi-finals in order to compete for the final; the top nine songs from each semi-final as determined by televoting progress to the final, and a tenth was determined by back-up juries. The European Broadcasting Union (EBU) split up the competing countries into six different pots based on voting patterns from previous contests, with countries with favourable voting histories put into the same pot. On 28 January 2008, a special allocation draw was held which placed each country into one of the two semi-finals. Denmark was placed into the second semi-final, to be held on 22 May 2008. The running order for the semi-finals was decided through another draw on 17 March 2008 and as one of the six wildcard countries, Denmark chose to perform in position 13, following the entry from Sweden and before the entry from Georgia.

The two semi-finals and final were broadcast on DR1 with commentary by Nikolaj Molbech. The Danish spokesperson, who announced the Danish votes during the final, was Lise Rønne.

Semi-final 

Simon Mathew took part in technical rehearsals on 14 and 18 May, followed by dress rehearsals on 21 and 22 May. The Danish performance featured Simon Mathew dressed in a white shirt, braces and a vintage hat and performing with two guitar players, a keyboard player, a drummer and a backing vocalist. The LED screens displayed fireworks in blue, white and purple colours. The musicians that joined Simon Mathew were: Anders Øhrstrøm, Kim Nowak-Zorde, Morten Hellmann and Oliver McEwan, while the backing vocalist was Mette Dahl Trudslev.

At the end of the show, Denmark was announced as having finished in the top 10 and subsequently qualifying for the grand final. It was later revealed that Denmark placed third in the semi-final, receiving a total of 112 points.

Final 
Shortly after the second semi-final, a winners' press conference was held for the ten qualifying countries. As part of this press conference, the qualifying artists took part in a draw to determine the running order of the final. This draw was done in the order the countries appeared in the semi-final running order. Denmark was drawn to perform in position 16, following the entry from Sweden and before the entry from Georgia.

Simon Mathew once again took part in dress rehearsals on 23 and 24 May before the final. Simon Mathew performed a repeat of his semi-final performance during the final on 24 May. At the conclusion of the voting, Denmark finished in fifteenth place with 60 points. The final of the contest was watched by a total of 965 thousand viewers in Denmark.

Voting 
Below is a breakdown of points awarded to Denmark and awarded by Denmark in the second semi-final and grand final of the contest. The nation awarded its 12 points to Sweden in the semi-final and to Iceland in the final of the contest.

Points awarded to Denmark

Points awarded by Denmark

References

2008
Countries in the Eurovision Song Contest 2008
Eurovision
Eurovision